CNBC Arabia (Arabic: CNBC عربية) is an Arab free-to-air television channel. It covers regional and international affairs from an Arab economic perspective.

CNBC Arabia's daily program schedule features the region's business news summary, including regional stock market summary, regional corporate news, news about women in business, news about green businesses, and personal finance. It also includes developments from Europe and America, concentrating on how they affect the Middle East.

It is the only business-focused channel that delivers live regional market data in the Middle East market, providing both a ticker and analytical reporting. The channel also offers an interactive website at cnbcarabia.com.

Headquarters

CNBC Arabia's broadcast facilities are based at Dubai Media City in the United Arab Emirates. There are additional bureaus in Abu Dhabi, Jeddah, Riyadh, Cairo, Kuwait, Bahrain, and Qatar. In addition, the channel has correspondents reporting from London and Singapore, the headquarters of the main European and Asian channel of CNBC. In Bahrain, CNBC Arabia shared the same bureau with CNBC Europe and both located in Manama, the capital city of Bahrain. Since that, CNBC Arabia now offering the Arabian market reports in dual languages, Arabic and English for the European channel.

References

External links

Official Site 
Interview with Mohamed AbdelRahman from CNBC Arabia 
Company profile 

 
2003 establishments in the United Arab Emirates
Business-related television channels
Arabic-language television stations
CNBC global channels
Mass media companies of the United Arab Emirates
Television channels and stations established in 2003